Daniel Daperis is an Australian actor and director. He is best known for his acting roles in the television series The Man From Snowy River and the children's television series Thunderstone. Daniel Daperis is the older brother of actor Jared Daperis.

References

External links
 www.DAPERISBROTHERS.com

1987 births
Living people
Australian male film actors
Australian male television actors
Australian people of Greek descent